Barthélémy Chinenyeze (born 28 February 1998) is a French professional volleyball player. He is a member of the France national team. The 2020 Olympic Champion and the 2017 World League winner. At the professional club level, he plays for Cucine Lube Civitanova.

Personal life
Chinenyeze is of Igbo Nigerian descent.

Career
He joined the French national team in 2017, and participated at the 2017 European Championship and the 2017 World Grand Champions Cup. He was a gold medalist of the 2017 World League. On 2 March 2018, he joined Asseco Resovia.

Honours

Clubs
 National championships
 2018/2019  French Cup, with Tours VB
 2018/2019  French Championship, with Tours VB

Individual awards
 2018: French Championship – Best Middle Blocker
 2019: French Championship – Most Valuable Player
 2019: French Championship – Best Middle Blocker
 2021: Olympic Games – Best Middle Blocker

State awards
 2021:  Knight of the Legion of Honour

References

External links

 
 Player profile at LegaVolley.it  
 Player profile at PlusLiga.pl  
 
 Player profile at Volleybox.net

1998 births
Living people
French people of Igbo descent
French men's volleyball players
Olympic volleyball players of France
Olympic medalists in volleyball
Olympic gold medalists for France
Medalists at the 2020 Summer Olympics
Volleyball players at the 2020 Summer Olympics
French expatriate sportspeople in Poland
Expatriate volleyball players in Poland
French expatriate sportspeople in Italy
Expatriate volleyball players in Italy
Tours Volley-Ball players
Resovia (volleyball) players
Middle blockers